The Governor of Duncannon Fort was a military officer who commanded the garrison at Duncannon in County Wexford. In later years the post became a sinecure and was abolished on the death of the last holder in 1835.

List of governors

 Sir Cary Reynolds
 Sir John Brockett
 Sir John Dowdall
 1604–1606: Sir Josias Bodley
 1606–1646: Laurence Esmonde, 1st Baron Esmonde
 Thomas Roche
 1649–1650: Edward Wogan
 1650–1654: Maj. Overstreet
 1654–1659: Capt. Betts (Bates)
 1659–: Col. Simon Rugeley
 1690–1698: Sir James Jefferyes
 1698–1711: Toby Purcell
 1711–1728: Robert Stearne
 1728–1735: Philip Honywood
 1735–1740: Charles Cathcart, 8th Lord Cathcart
 1741–1751: Gervais Parker
 1751–1767: John Leslie, 10th Earl of Rothes
 1768–1782: Lord Robert Bertie
 1782–1795: James Johnston
 1795–1802: Sir Robert Sloper
 1802–1814: Ralph Dundas
 1814–1835: Sir John Hamilton

See also
 Siege of Duncannon

References

History of County Wexford
British military appointments
Duncannon
1835 disestablishments in the United Kingdom